A number of beauty queens have run and been elected for political office and have become prominent politicians, and it has been said that "participation in beauty pageants can serve as a path to power for women".

List of political officeholders

Federal/national
The following is a list of beauty pageant winners who have held a federal or national political office.
 – Incumbent officeholder

Local
The following is a list of beauty pageant winners who have held a local or otherwise non-federal political office.
 – Incumbent officeholder

List of political candidates
The following is a list of beauty pageant titleholders who have been candidates for political offices, but have not been elected.

References

Lists of women politicians
Politicians
Lists of politicians